In 1789 the English Royal Navy Cutter the Bounty commanded by Lieutenant William Bligh was overtaken by 18 crew led by Master's Mate Fletcher Christian in what has been named the "Mutiny on the Bounty."  The area known as the Bligh Water is the body of water (approximately 9500 km2 in extent) in the western Fiji islands through which Bligh sailed his 7 m (23 ft) launch during his 3,618 mile journey from Tofua to the Dutch port of Timor.  At the time some of the local Fijian tribes were considered hostile and many were cannibalistic so Bligh did not wish to jeopardize his safety or the safety of his crew elected not stop his journey in the area.

SCUBA Diving the Bligh Water 

Today many people refer to the area of the Vatu-I-Ra Passage, around the island of Vatu, as the "Bligh Water".  While this is technically true, and the Vatu-I-Ra passage is located in the Bligh Water, the real Bligh Water is much larger.  The Vatu-I-Ra Passage, now a marine protected area, is famous for its abundance and diversity of marine life.  One of the main attractions are the plentiful populations of beautiful hard and soft corals which thousands of SCUBA divers each year visit to enjoy and photograph.

External links
 Geological study of the Bligh Water
 Bligh Encyclopedia's Bligh Water entry

Bodies of water of Fiji